Parity  may refer to:

 Parity (computing)
 Parity bit in computing, sets the parity of data for the purpose of error detection
 Parity flag in computing, indicates if the number of set bits is odd or even in the binary representation of the result of the last operation
 Parity file in data processing, created in conjunction with data files and used to check data integrity and assist in data recovery
 Parity (mathematics), indicates whether a number is even or odd
 Parity of a permutation, indicates whether a permutation has an even or odd number of inversions
 Parity function, a Boolean function whose value is 1 if the input vector has an odd number of ones
 Parity learning, a problem in machine learning
 Parity of even and odd functions
 Parity (physics), a symmetry property of physical quantities or processes under spatial inversion
 Parity (biology), the number of times a female has given birth; gravidity and parity represent pregnancy and viability, respectively
 Parity (charity), UK equal rights organisation
 Parity (law), legal principle
 Mental Health Parity Act, also applies to substance use disorder
 Purchasing power parity, in economics, the exchange rate required to equalise the purchasing power of different currencies
 Interest rate parity, in finance, the notion that the differential in interest rates between two countries is equal to the differential between the forward exchange rate and the spot exchange rate
 Put–call parity, in financial mathematics, defines a relationship between the price of a European call option and a European put option
 Parity (sports), an equal playing field for all participants, regardless of their economic circumstances
 Potty parity, equalization of waiting times for males and females in restroom queues
 A tactic in reversi
 Grid parity of renewable energy
 Doctrine of parity, agricultural price controls
 Military parity, equipotential readiness between foes, without gaps such as a missile gap
Special cases in combination puzzles

tr:Parite